OceanX is an ocean exploration initiative founded by Mark Dalio and Ray Dalio, founder of investment firm Bridgewater Associates,  An initiative by Dalio Philanthropies, OceanX is a “mission to explore the ocean and bring it back to the world. OceanX combines science, technology and media to explore and raise awareness for the oceans and “create a community engaged with protecting them.” The initiative also supports and facilitates ocean research for scientists, science institutions, media companies and philanthropy partners.

MV Alucia 

OceanX’s marine research vessel, the MV Alucia, is a 56-meter research and exploration vessel utilized in the organization’s research and filming expeditions. The vessel is outfitted with two deep-sea submersibles (Triton Submersibles models 3300/3  named Nadir  and the Deep Rover 2), both rated for a maximum depth of 1,000 meters; an A-star helicopter and helipad; dry and wet science labs; 8K Red cameras, low-light submersible cameras and custom underwater camera housings; and a media room.

OceanX Media 
OceanX Media (formerly Alucia Productions) is the media production arm of OceanX. OceanX Media worked with the BBC Earth on the nature documentary series Blue Planet II, taking BBC Studios on nine missions that contributed to four episodes of the series, including Episode 2, The Deep, in which OceanX and BBC conducted the first-ever deep-sea submersible dives to the Antarctic seafloor. The episode was nominated for a Primetime Emmy Award for Outstanding Cinematography for a Nonfiction Program. A video from the dive won the Webby Award in Social: Education and Discovery in 2019. The video was directed by OceanX Media Creative Director Mark Dalio.

Alongside BBC Earth, OceanX Media co-produced Oceans: Our Blue Planet, the Giant Screen companion film to Blue Planet II. The film is sponsored by Microsoft.

OceanX Media content has also been featured in media outlets including Mashable, Business Insider, Scientific American, Earther, and Discovery Channel Canada.

Accomplishments 
OceanX missions and missions aboard the MV Alucia have been responsible for:

 Capturing the first-ever footage of the Giant Squid
 Exploring the Australian barrier reef with Sir David Attenborough for the Emmy Award-winning series Great Barrier Reef 
 Exploring the ocean’s blue holes for the Emmy Award-winning series Years of Living Dangerously
 Discovery of the wreckage of Air France Flight 447
 Discovery of the Jaguar catshark
 Discovery of over 180 new species of bioluminescent fish
 The first-ever open-water test of Orpheus, a deep-sea drone prototype developed by the Woods Hole Oceanographic Institution and the NASA Jet Propulsion Laboratory to explore the oceanographic hadal zone and Saturn’s moon Europa.

Partners 
In addition to its internal science and media operations, OceanX partners with several media, science and philanthropy organizations to facilitate and support their ocean research. Partners include the American Museum of Natural History, BBC Studios, filmmaker James Cameron, photographer Paul Nicklen, and the Woods Hole Oceanographic Institution, explorer Sylvia Earle, and scientists Edith Widder and Samantha Joye.

OceanX co-created the #OurBluePlanet digital initiative with BBC Earth with the goal of getting 1 billion people talking about the oceans.

In 2018, OceanX partnered with Bloomberg Philanthropies to commit $185 million over four years to ocean exploration and protection efforts.

References 

Ocean exploration